Riders Radio Theater is a studio album by the Western band Riders in the Sky based on their radio program Riders Radio Theater. It was released in 1988 and it is available as a single CD.

It contains 18 digitally recorded selections. Like the radio program itself, the album includes cowboy music, musical skits, mock "Public Service Announcements", traffic reports, and commercials. It is, in part, a spoof the 1930s era Western singing cowboy serials.

Track listing
 "The Scene"
 "Riders Radio Theme"
 "Chant of the Wanderer"
 "Udder Butter on a Rope"
 "Trail Traffic Report"
 "Sagebrush Sports Report"
 "Cattle Call"
 "Bio Feedbag"
 "Trail Traffic Update"
 "Call of the Wild"
 "Triple X Stock Report"
 "Sundown Blues"
 "Riders Radio Theme (Reprise)"
 "Pops"
 "Saddle Whiz"
 "Meltdown on the Mesa"
 "So Long Saddle Pals"
 "The Long Shot "

Critical reception
Allmusic gave "Riders Radio Theater" a rating of three stars out of five.

Personnel
Douglas B. Green (a.k.a. Ranger Doug) – guitar, vocals
Paul Chrisman (a.k.a. Woody Paul) – fiddle, vocals
Fred LaBour (a.k.a. Too Slim) – bass, vocals
Steve Arwood (a.k.a. Texas Bix Bender) - narrator

References

External links
Riders in the Sky Official Website
Listen Live link

1988 albums
Riders in the Sky (band) albums
MCA Records albums